Birinci Aral (also, Aral Pervoye and Aral Pervyy) is a village and municipality in the Agdash Rayon of Azerbaijan. It has a population of 1,521. The municipality consists of the villages of Birinci Aral and İkinci Aral.

References 

Populated places in Agdash District